BBVA Provincial (BVC: BPV) (formerly BBVA Banco Provincial) is a financial institution in Venezuela.

History
Founded on October 15, 1953, in Caracas, Venezuela, as Banco Provincial with a capital of Bs. 15,000,000. In November 1996, Banco Provincial became the first universal bank in Venezuela by expanding its business objectives to include activities of specialized banking.

In 1997, Spain’s Banco Bilbao Vizcaya (now Banco Bilbao Vizcaya Argentaria) acquired the majority of shares as a strategy of expansion into Latin America. BBVA's entry in Venezuela coincided with Hugo Chávez' presidential election.

Once Nicolás Maduro came to power in Venezuela, the bank's benefits dropped from 369 million euros in 2013 to -13 million euros in 2017. While Banco Santander shut its Venezuelan operations in 2009, BBVA chose to maintain theirs despite the economic crisis.

References

External links
http://www.provincial.com/ Official site (Spanish)
http://www.bbva.es BBVA official site (Spanish)

Banks of Venezuela
Banco Bilbao Vizcaya Argentaria
Banks established in 1953
Companies listed on the Caracas Stock Exchange
Venezuelan companies established in 1953
Venezuelan brands
Companies based in Caracas